Our Lady of the Rocks is one of the two islets off the coast of Perast in the Bay of Kotor, Montenegro (the other being Sveti Đorđe island). It is an artificial island created by bulwark of rocks and by sinking old and seized ships loaded with rocks. The Roman Catholic Church of Our Lady of the Rocks is the largest building on the islet; it has a museum attached. There is also a small gift shop close to the church and a navigation light at the western end of the islet.

According to legend, the islet was made over the centuries by local seamen who kept an ancient oath after finding the icon of Madonna and Child on the rock in the sea on 22 July 1452. Upon returning from each successful voyage, they laid a rock in the Bay. Over time, the islet gradually emerged from the sea. The custom of throwing rocks into the sea is alive even nowadays. Every year on the sunset of 22 July, an event called fašinada in the local dialect, when local residents take their boats and throw rocks into the sea, widening the surface of the island, takes place.

The church was renovated in 1722. The church contains 68 paintings by Tripo Kokolja, a famous 17th-century baroque artist from Perast. His most important painting, ten meters long, is The Death of the Virgin. There are also paintings by Italian artists, and an icon (circa 1452) of Our Lady of the Rocks, by Lovro Dobričević of Kotor. The church also houses a collection of silver votive tablets and a famous votive tapestry embroidered by Jacinta Kunić-Mijović from Perast. It took her 25 years to finish it while waiting for her darling to return from a long journey, and eventually, she became blind. She used golden and silver fibres but what makes this tapestry so famous is the fact that she also embroidered her own hair in it.

Gallery

See also

 Natural and Culturo-Historical Region of Kotor
 Roman Catholicism in Montenegro

References

External links
 

Roman Catholic churches in Montenegro
Islands of Montenegro
Islands of the Adriatic Sea
Perast
Tourist attractions in Kotor
Artificial islands